James Hood is a former award-winning receiver in the Canadian Football League.

A graduate of Arizona State University, Hood came to Canada in 1985 and played with the Winnipeg Blue Bombers where he caught 25 passes in 5 games. He moved to the Montreal Alouettes in 1986, where in 18 games he caught 95 passes for 1411 yards and two touchdowns, winning the Jeff Russel Memorial Trophy as best player in the East and was named an all star. 1987 found him with the Ottawa Rough Riders, where in 9 games he hauled in 39 passes. He finished his career in 1988 with the Saskatchewan Roughriders.

References

1961 births
Living people
Players of American football from Los Angeles
American players of Canadian football
Canadian football wide receivers
Arizona State Sun Devils football players
Winnipeg Blue Bombers players
Montreal Alouettes players
Ottawa Rough Riders players
Saskatchewan Roughriders players
Players of Canadian football from Los Angeles